Lothan Cousins is a Jamaican People's National Party politician who has been Member of Parliament for Clarendon South Western since 2020. He attended the University of the West Indies.

References 

Living people

Year of birth missing (living people)
People's National Party (Jamaica) politicians

University of the West Indies alumni
21st-century Jamaican politicians
Members of the House of Representatives of Jamaica
People from Clarendon Parish, Jamaica
Members of the 14th Parliament of Jamaica